Second Tompkins County Courthouse, also known as Old Courthouse, is a historic courthouse located at 121 E. Court Street in Ithaca in Tompkins County, New York. It is a two-story, 57 feet by 75 feet rectangular building with a three-story tower.  The building is built of red brick, covered with stucco, over a stone foundation.  The tower contains a belfry with a pointed arch opening on each of the four sides.  It was built in 1854 and has a notable open timber roof.

It was listed on the National Register of Historic Places in 1971.

See also
 De Witt Park Historic District

References

External links

Courthouses on the National Register of Historic Places in New York (state)
Historic American Buildings Survey in New York (state)
County courthouses in New York (state)
Government buildings completed in 1854
Buildings and structures in Ithaca, New York
National Register of Historic Places in Tompkins County, New York
1854 establishments in New York (state)